Last Summer When We Were Famous is an album by Staggered Crossing, released in 2002.

Track listing 

"Losing's Alright"
"Felony"
"Everyone Says"
"Photograph"
"Business as Usual"
"Heart Attack (That's a Drag)"
"Confessions"
"Obvious Way to My Heart"
"What You Were Yesterday"
"What I Said"
"Felony" (Bonus Track - Alternate Version)

External links 
 https://web.archive.org/web/20060510062212/http://www.muchmusic.com/music/artists/bio.asp?artist=599

2002 albums
Staggered Crossing albums
Outside Music albums
Albums produced by Jay Bennett